Sarah Connolly (born 1963) is an English mezzo-soprano.

Sarah Connolly may also refer to one of the following:

Sarah A. Connolly, American virologist
Sarah Connolly (politician), Australian Labor Party politician
Sarah Sugden (also Connolly), fictional character in British soap opera Emmerdale

See also
Sarah O'Connell (1822?–1870), New Zealand runholder